Amr̥tavarṣiṇi is a rāgam in Carnatic music (musical scale of South Indian classical music), created in the early nineteenth century by Muthuswami Dikshitar. It is an audava rāgam (meaning pentatonic scale) in which only five of the seven swaras (musical notes) are used. It is a janya rāgam (derived scale), fairly popular in Carnatic music. There is a belief that Amr̥tavarṣiṇi causes rain ( The name of the rāgam is derived from the Sanskrit words Amrita: meaning Nectar and Varshini: meaning one who causes a shower or rain, and hence the association with rain ), and that the Carnatic composer Muthuswami Dikshitar brought rain at Ettayapuram, Tamil Nadu, India by singing his composition, Aanandaamrutakarshini amrutavarshini.

Structure and Lakshana 

Amr̥tavarṣiṇi is a rāgam that does not contain rishabham and dhaivatam. It is a symmetric pentatonic scale (audava-audava ragam in Carnatic music classification). Its  structure (ascending and descending scale) is as follows (see swaras in Carnatic music for details on below notation and terms):

 : 
 : 

The notes used in this scale are shadjam, antara gandharam, prati madhyamam, panchamam and kakali nishādam)

Amr̥tavarṣiṇi  is considered a janya rāgam of Chitrambari, the 66th Melakarta rāgam, although it can be derived from other melakarta rāgams, such as Kalyani, Gamanashrama or Vishwambari, by dropping both rishabham and dhaivatam. There is another scale that has the same name but is less practiced in current performances. This scale is associated with the 39th melakarta Jhalavarali.

Popular compositions
Amr̥tavarṣiṇi rāgam lends itself for extensive elaboration and exploration due to the symmetric and pentatonic scale. It has many compositions in both classical music and film music. Here are some popular kritis and film music composed in Amr̥tavarṣiṇi.
Ennai Nee Maravate of Dandapani Desikar
Sarasiruhanayane of Thyagaraja (usually said misattributed)
Sarasijaasani of Muthuswami Dikshitar
Vani Parama Kalyani By Vadiraja Tirtha
Eesabeku Iddu By Purandara Dasa
Aanandaamrutakarshini amritavarshini of Muthuswami Dikshitar (The most popular song sung today in Amritavarshini)
Aadi Varuvai Guhane of Punitasri
Siddhi Nayakena of M. Balamuralikrishna
Sthirata Nahi Nahi Re of Sadashiva Brahmendra
Aadinateppadiyo Nadanam, anonymous 
Sudhamayee Sudhanidi by Muthiah Bhagavatar

In addition to these, Anni Mantramuli Inde Avahinchenu of Annamacharya has been set to music in the Amr̥tavarṣiṇi.

Film Songs

Language: Tamil

Language: Malayalam 

Oru dalam matram from Jalakam, composed by M G Radhakrishnan , sung by K.J. Yesudas
Manam pon Manam from Idavelakku Sesham, composed by Raveendran, sung by K.J. Yesudas
Aashadham padumbol from Mazha, composed by Raveendran, sung by K.J. Yesudas
Neela lohita hitakarini from Kaveri, composed by Ilayaraja, sung by M. Balamuralikrishna
Devi ni en pon veena nadam from Oru Mutham Mani Mutham, composed by Raveendran, sung by K.J. Yesudas
Anupallavi of Vilikkatirunnalum virunninettum from Ishtamanu Pakshe, composed by G. Devarajan, sung by K.J. Yesudas
Pallavi of Sharatkala megham from Dhruvasangamam, composed by Raveendran, sung by K.J. Yesudas
Parts of charanam in Kasturi Gandhikal from Sethubandhanam, composed by G. Devarajan, sung by Ayiroor Sadasivan 
Pallavi of Aadi parashakti from Ponnapuram Kotta, composed by G. Devarajan, sung by P.B. Sreenivas and P. Leela

Language: Kannada 

Cheluveya andada mogake from Devara Gudi, composed by Rajan–Nagendra, sung by S. P. Balasubrahmanyam
Naguve snehada haadu from Mugdha Manava, composed by Vijaya Bhaskar, sung by S.P. Balasubrahmanyam
Chaitrada kusumanjali from Anandabhairavi, composed by Ramesh Naidu, sung by S.P. Balasubrahmanyam (anupallavi and charanam include other ragas too).
Charanam of Devaru beseda premada hara from Muttina Hara, composed by Hamsalekha, sung by M. Balamuralikrishna

Language: Telugu 

Aanati neeyara hara from Swati Kiranam, composed by K.V. Mahadevan, sung by Vani Jayaram 
Jeevana vahini, a ragamalika from Gangotri, composed by M.M. Keeravani, sung by M.M. Keeravani, Ganga, Kalpana and Srivardhini
Kurisenu Virijallule, from Gharshana (Old), composed by Ilaiyaraaja, sung by S.P. Balasunrahmanyam, Vani Jairam

Raga relationships

Graha bhēdham
Amritavarshini's notes when shifted using Graha bhedam, yields 1 popular pentatonic rāgam, Karnataka Shuddha Saveri. Graha bhedam is the step taken in keeping the relative note frequencies same, while shifting the shadjam to the next note in the rāgam. For more details and illustration of this concept refer Graha bhedam on Amr̥tavarṣiṇi.

Scale similarities
Hamsadhvani is a rāgam which has chatushruti rishabham in place of the prati madhyamam. See table below for more details
Gambhiranata is a rāgam which has shuddha madhyamam in place of the prati madhyamam. See table below for more details

See also

 List of film songs based on ragas

Notes

References 

Janya ragas